Marlene (French: Marlène) is a 1949 French musical crime film directed by Pierre de Hérain and starring Tino Rossi, Micheline Francey and Lily Fayol.

The film's sets were designed by the art director Paul-Louis Boutié.

Cast
 Tino Rossi as Manuel Ceccaldi
 Micheline Francey as Marie-Hélène
 Lily Fayol as Suzy
 Raymond Bussières as Harris
 Jacques Castelot as Breteville 
 Paul Azaïs as Le barman 
 José Artur as La Puce
 Michel Barbey as Michel
 Pauline Carton as La vieille dame
 Mathilde Casadesus as Betty
 Pierre Duncan 
 René Lacourt as Le pépiniériste
 Francis Lopez as Le pianiste
 Jean-Pierre Lorrain 
 Robert Lussac as Le commissaire
 Julien Maffre as Un Corse
 Jean Mercure as Un gangster
 Raymond Meunier 
 Marcelle Monthil as La mère 
 Raphaël Patorni as César Luciani
 Marcel Rouzé 
 Roger Saget as Le mari trompé
 Germaine Stainval as La dame du vestiaire
 André Valmy as Laurin
 Lilia Vetti as Lola

References

Bibliography 
 Maurice Bessy & Raymond Chirat. Histoire du cinéma français: 1940-1950. Pygmalion, 1986.

External links 
 

1949 films
French musical films
1949 musical films
1940s French-language films
Films directed by Pierre de Hérain
French crime films
1949 crime films
French black-and-white films
1940s French films